Liolaemus occipitalis (skull tree iguana) is a species of lizard in the family Liolaemidae.
It is found on the Atlantic coast of southern Brazil and eastern Uruguay.

Its natural habitat is sandy shores. It is threatened by habitat loss.

References

Lizards of South America
Reptiles of Brazil
occipitalis
Reptiles described in 1885
Taxa named by George Albert Boulenger
Taxonomy articles created by Polbot